Li Tie (born 18 May 1977) is a Chinese professional football coach and former player.

As a player he represented Liaoning FC in the Chinese Jia-A League, Everton in the Premier League, Sheffield United in the Football League Championship and Chengdu Blades in the Chinese Super League. At international level, he made 92 appearances scoring 6 goals for the China national team. After retirement from playing, he started his coaching career as an assistant coach at Guangzhou Evergrande. He moved to the China national team and then Hebei China Fortune where he gained his first coaching position.

Club career

Liaoning FC
Li Tie began his football career at the age of fifteen, joining Liaoning FC's youth academy system in 1992. The following year he was sent to Brazil for a five-year training programme sponsored by Jianlibao and became the captain of the newly organized youth football team. Li started his professional career by playing for Liaoning FC and rose to prominence during the 1999 league season when Liaoning finished as runners-up within the league.

Everton
One of the highest regarded Chinese players of his generation, Li secured a loan transfer in a deal brokered between sponsor Kejian and Premier League side Everton in August 2002. Despite initial skepticism at Merseyside, his first season as an Everton player was a surprising success. Then manager David Moyes played him in twenty-nine league games and started him in most of his appearances where his displays as a defensive midfielder helped the club achieve a seventh-place finish during the 2002-03 season.

Following Li's successful loan spell, Everton battled with his former club Liaoning FC to sign him on a permanent basis after the 2002-03 season and the deal was finally negotiated on 12 August 2003 when Li signed a three-year contract. Everton paid £1,200,000 for his transfer with two-thirds of the deal paid by sponsorships. The club's ownership let him move to the Premier League despite higher offers from Chinese clubs. At the beginning of the 2003-04 season, Li's start was marred by a sending off against Arsenal on 16 August 2003 after only been substituted on for David Unsworth. A series of injuries followed which meant that Li only played five league matches that season. The last injury, a broken leg picked up during international duty in February 2004, ruled him out for another twelve months. In January 2005, when Li made his return to the pitch by playing for Everton's reserve side against Bolton Wanderers, he lasted just forty-one minutes and required his leg to be reassessed.

In the summer of 2005, eighteen months since his last game for the Everton first team, Li played the full match against FC Gamlitz in a pre-season friendly. He made a number of other preseason appearances and looked as if he was finally coming back to full fitness. However, he never managed to break back into the first team despite playing regularly for the reserves and even earning another international call-up for the Chinese national team. In March 2006, Li underwent another operation to remove pieces of bone that had grown on his ankle during his time on the sidelines.

Sheffield United
In May 2006, Li was released by Everton and Sheffield United announced his signing on a free transfer in July 2006, agreeing to a two-year contract. Following his move, Li spent some time training with China League One side Chengdu Blades, which was owned by Sheffield United, while waiting for his visa clearance. On 19 September 2006, Li made his first competitive club start since January 2004 by appearing for Sheffield United in a League Cup match against Bury. However, Li did not make another appearance for Sheffield United afterwards due to his lingering injury.

On 12 October 2007, Li was told he could leave Sheffield United on a free transfer with then manager Bryan Robson saying, "He's not in my plans and he is free to go wherever he wants on a free transfer." Only two days later though, Sheffield United changed their mind on the decision and stated that he would stay at the club until the end of the season before having his future evaluated.

Back to China
Despite reassurances to the contrary, Li did indeed move in 2008, transferring to Sheffield United's affiliated club Chengdu Blades to reinforce the team after their promotion to the Chinese Super League and made his debut in the opening game of the 2008 season against his former club Liaoning Whowin. He scored first league goal in his football career in a 3-1 win against Shenzhen Shangqingyin in October 2008.

After spending one season with Chengdu, Li decided to return to his hometown club Liaoning Whowin to help them in their promotion push back to the top tier. It proved to be an immediate success when he guided them to the securing the second tier league title and being promoted back to the top flight after only one season. He suffered an injury in October 2010 which ruled him out for the whole 2011 season. After not fully recovering from his leg injury, Li announced that he had decided to retire from football at the end of the 2011 season.

International career
Li was one of four players called up from the Shenzhen Youth for the final round of 1998 FIFA World Cup qualifiers by Qi Wusheng, along with Li Jinyu, Sui Dongliang, and Zhang Xiaorui. He was already a veteran in the China national team by the time the national team played in the 2002 FIFA World Cup. Recovering from an injury, Li returned to competitive football in June 2006 with substitute appearances for the China national team against Switzerland and France. He was once again called up to play for the national team in a friendly against Thailand on 10 August 2006 and in a 2007 AFC Asian Cup qualifier against Singapore on 16 August 2006. Li remained as a part of the national side and was called up by Zhu Guanghu to play the 2007 AFC Asian Cup, but failed to make an appearance during the tournament.

Managerial career
On 25 May 2012, Li accepted an invitation from Guangzhou Evergrande manager Marcello Lippi to become one of his assistant coaches. He also became the assistant coach of the Chinese national team under Alain Perrin in May 2014. He resigned from his position as assistant coach on 26 June 2015 after about three seasons with Guangzhou. 

Li became the deputy general manager, sports director and assistant coach at China League One side Hebei China Fortune on 14 July 2015. On 18 August 2015, he was assigned as the manager of the club after Radomir Antić's departure. Li led the club to win promotion to Chinese Super League in the 2015 season by winning eight matches in the rest of nine and finishing the runners-up in the league. On 27 August 2016, Li was replaced by Manuel Pellegrini after winning just one match in the last nine matches. 

On 16 November 2017, Li was appointed as the head coach of China League One club Wuhan Zall. In the 2018 season, he led the club to the Chinese Super after a five-year absence, being confirmed as champions and achieving promotion with three matches remaining in the season.

He acted as caretaker coach of Chinese national team following the resignation of Marcello Lippi in 2019. On 2 January 2020, Li was appointed as the new manager of China. On 3 December 2021, Li was replaced by fellow 2002 World Cup teammate Li Xiaopeng.

Investigation
On 26 November 2022, Li has been placed under investigation for "serious violations of laws" by the Central Commission for Discipline Inspection (CCDI), the party's internal disciplinary body, and the National Supervisory Commission, the highest anti-corruption agency of China.

Career statistics

Club

International
Scores and results list China's goal tally first, score column indicates score after each Li goal.

Managerial statistics

Honours

Player
Liaoning Whowin
China League One: 2009
Chinese FA Super Cup: 1999

Individual
Chinese Jia-A League Team of the Year: 1999, 2001

Manager
Wuhan Zall
China League One: 2018

Individual
China League One Coach of the Year: 2018

References

External links

Sohu.com profile

1977 births
Living people
Footballers from Shenyang
Chinese footballers
Association football midfielders
Association football forwards
Liaoning F.C. players
Everton F.C. players
Sheffield United F.C. players
Chengdu Tiancheng F.C. players
Chinese Super League players
Premier League players
China League One players
Chinese expatriate footballers
Chinese expatriate sportspeople in England
Expatriate footballers in England
Footballers at the 1998 Asian Games
Asian Games medalists in football
Asian Games bronze medalists for China
Medalists at the 1998 Asian Games
China international footballers
2000 AFC Asian Cup players
2002 FIFA World Cup players
2007 AFC Asian Cup players
Chinese football managers
Guangzhou F.C. non-playing staff
Hebei F.C. non-playing staff
Hebei F.C. managers
Wuhan F.C. managers
China national football team managers
Chinese Super League managers